Matthew Christian Metcalfe FRHistS FRGS (born 1 March 1973) is a New Zealand film producer and screenwriter known for his biographical and documentary films. Metcalfe has also produced comedies and drama films, as well as being involved in several television series. At the start of his career, Metcalfe worked as a music producer in the early 2000s before moving into film and television.

An early accolade he received was the best music video Tui Award in 2002 for Che Fu's, Fade Away video. After working in music video production, Metcalfe then went onto producing several short films to then full feature films and television series. In his film career, Metcalfe has received several accolades, including winning the Best Picture Award for Dean Spanley (2008) and being nominated for Nemesis Game (2003) at the Qantas Film and Television Awards. In 2013, Metcalfe was awarded Independent Producer of the Year at the SPADA Screen Industry Awards.

Notable films he has produced include Dean Spanley (2008), The Dead Lands(2014), Beyond The Edge (2013), Whina (2022),McLaren (2017), Mothers of the Revolution (2021) and The Subtle Art of Not Giving a F*ck (2023).

Early life 
Metcalfe was born in Christchurch, New Zealand. His family moved to Papua New Guinea to then Canberra, Australia, when Metcalfe was a child. Metcalfe did military time in Australia and New Zealand. Metcalfe was interested in film when he completed a Bachelor of Commerce Degree at Auckland University. He also went to the University of Oxford where he received an Advanced Diploma in English History.

Career 

Metcalfe worked as a music video producer in the early 2000s, with Shihad, Hayley Westenra and Che Fu. Metcalfe's first credit as a producer was for the 1999 short film, 9 Across. He was involved with the script writer, Jesse Warn who was promised to getting 9 Across on-screen. 9 Across won the script writer an award for Best Contribution to a Short at the 1999 NZ Film and TV Awards.

During the early 2000’s Metcalfe started working on more short films and music videos. Working in between jobs as a waiter, shelf stacker and cinema usher. At one point he went into the New Zealand Radio station, bFM and offered to make a music video for any band with a budget of $1,000. He then went on to produce music videos for Shihad and Hayley Westenra. In 2001 he produced the Tui-Award-winning music video for Che Fu's Fade Away.

Metcalfe teamed up again with film writer Jesse Warn to work on more projects. They worked further on with a TV series about the New Zealand band, Steriogram. He teamed up with Warn again to produce the 2003 film Nemesis Game. In 2005 he produced the TV series, Air Force which was about the Royal New Zealand Air Force. He then went to focus on a more personal documentary about his own father, Frank, in Vietnam - My Father's War which was released in 2006.

Around this time Metcalfe started to direct documentaries including the 2007 documentary, Soldiers of Fortune. He was also involved in the development of the 2008 feature-length documentary, Relocated Mountains which follows a Kurdish refugee's trip from New Zealand back to Iraq.

In 2007, a film that Metcalfe produced, The Ferryman was released. At this point he began working with producer Alan Harris with Dean Spanley which was released in 2008. At the 2009 Qantas Film and Television Awards, Metcalfe was awarded alongside with co-producer Alan Harris, for the Best Feature award for Dean Spanley.

Metcalfe went on to produce a further four features with Toa Fraser, including, Giselle, The Dead Lands and the films, 6 Days and The Free Man. He also produced the romantic comedy, Love Birds that was released in 2011. In 2013 he produced the documentary, Beyond The Edge.

Metcalfe then worked with New Zealand producer Fraser Brown to work on more documentaries such as, McLaren, Born Racer - The Scott Dixon Story and Wayne. In 2020 Metcalfe produced the documentary, Dawn Raid.In 2021, Metcalfe produced Mothers of the Revolution which follows the story of the Greenham Common Women's Peace Camp protests.In 2022 the film was nominated for the Envy Best Single Documentary award at The Grierson Trust. Dawn Raid was also nominated in 2022 by The Grierson Trust for the Sky Documentaries Best Music Documentary award. 

In 2022 Metcalfe was one of the producers for the biographical film about the life of Dame Whina Cooper, Whina.

In 2023 a documentary film based off the book by Mark Mason, The Subtle Art of Not Giving a F*ck was released. Metcalfe served as one of the writers and producers. Films that are currently awaiting release which are produced by Metcalfe are Billion Dollar Heist, A Mistake,Never Look Away and The Tank.

Filmography

Feature films

Short films

Television

Awards and nominations 
In 2002, Metcalfe won a Tui Award for best music video. This was for Che Fu's, Fade Away video that was released the same year. In 2009, Dean Spanley won the award for Best Feature at the 2009 Qantas Film and Television Awards. This award was shared with co-producer Alan Harris.In 2013, Metcalfe was included in the nomination for Beyond the Edge for Best Documentary at the 2013 Rialto Channel New Zealand Film Awards.

References

External links 

 Matthew Metcalfe on NZ on Screen
 Matthew Metcalfe on IMDb

New Zealand film producers
Year of birth missing (living people)
Living people
People from Christchurch